Otegen Batyr (Ötegen Batyr) is a settlement and the administrative center of Ile District, Almaty Region, in south-eastern Kazakhstan. Population:

References

Populated places in Almaty Region